The Climate of Venezuela is characterized for being tropical and megathermal as a result of its geographical location near the Equator, but because of the topography and the dominant wind direction, several climatic types occur which can be the same as found in temperate latitudes, and even polar regions. Latitude exerts little influence on the Venezuelan 
While the coastal cities of Maracaibo, Barcelona, Porlamar and Maiquetia can get extremely hot, cities located at valleys such as Mérida, Caracas, Los Teques and San Cristobal have cooler climates, and the highest towns of Mucuchies and Apartaderos have cold (tundra) climates.

Climate zones according to Köppen

According to the Köppen climate classification, Venezuela's climate types are:

Group A: Tropical climates
It's the most prevalent and characteristic climate of the country. Maintaining temperatures above  and rainfall in most of the year:

Tropical savanna climate (Aw)
It can be found throughout the country, dominating the Llanos and northern Guayana Region, as well as other parts of the country. It is dry between December and March with annual rainfall between 600 and 1,500 mm.

Tropical monsoon climate (Am)
It is located in the Guayana Region, Orinoco Delta, west of Zulia, Andean and Coastal range foothills, Paria Peninsula and Barlovento region; with rainfall between 1,600 and 2,500 mm per year and a drought of just 45 days.

Tropical rainforest climate (Af)
It's located south of Venezuela, Orinoco Delta, El Tamá area in west of Venezuela, and south of Maracaibo Lake. Rainfall exceeds 2,500 mm, not tending dry season.

Group B: Dry climates
This type of climate the evaporation exceeds precipitation. In Venezuela is typical of desert and arid coastal areas and with annual temperatures above 18 °C. The cold semiarid type can be found at elevated portions of the Andes.

Hot desert climate (BWh)
It can be found in Guajira Peninsula, Paraguana Peninsula, Araya Peninsula and most of the Insular region.

Hot semi-arid climate (BSh)
It is located in the northern part of Zulia state, most of the area of Lara state and Falcón state, the coastal area, Insular region and some semi-arid areas in Venezuelan Andes.

Cold semi-arid (BSk)
It can be found locked at the temperate zones of high Andean valleys of  Cordillera de Mérida.

Group C: Temperate climates
The monthly averages temperatures are below 22 °C (72 °F) but above  0 °C (32 °F). At least one month's average temperature is below 18 °C (64 °F):

Temperate highland climates with dry winters (Cwb)
It tends to experience noticeably drier weather during the lower-sun "winter" season. It's located in the medium areas of the southern-east slope of Cordillera de Mérida and Sierra de Perija, the highest areas of south-western Venezuelan coastal range.

Temperate highland climates without dry season (Cfb)
This climate doesn't tend to has a dry season. It's located in the medium areas of the Cordillera de Mérida and Sierra de Perija, the highest areas of Venezuelan coastal range, and the top of the highest Guiana Highlands Tepuis.

Group E: Alpine climates
It's characterized by average temperatures below 10 °C in all 12 months of the year:

Alpine tundra (ETH) 
Also known as páramo climate, this climate often undergo a sudden and drastic change in daily-weather in which they fluctuate between temperatures from below freezing to as high as 20 °C. Mean annual temperatures range from 2 °C (36 °F) to 10 °C (50 °F). It is located above the 3,000 m in the Sierra de Perija and Cordillera de Mérida. The most popular village with this climate in the country is the town of Apartaderos

Alpine glacier (EFH)
This climate is reserved to the highest peaks of the Venezuelan Andes, such as Pico Bolívar, Pico Humboldt, [

Climate zones according to altitude

Venezuelan climates are structured in "thermal floors", as mentioned next:

Very Hot
This climate is characterized by very hot temperatures above , with precipitations that ranges from dry (less than 300 mm) to pluvial (more than 3300 mm) conditions. This climate can be found in areas below 300 m in sedimentary basins and lowlands such as the Llanos, Orinoco Delta, Maracaibo Basin, Orinoco Basin, and coastal plains and islands; it comprises almost all the country. This climate zone is present in cities like Maracaibo, Punto Fijo, Ciudad Guayana, Porlamar, Puerto La Cruz, Barinas, Tucupita, Cumaná, Maturin, Anaco, Ciudad Bolívar, Cabimas, El Vigía and others.

Warm
Warm climate can be found between 300 and 650 m. This climate can be found in lower foothills and plateaus in the Guiana Highlands, Venezuelan Coastal Range, Coro region and Venezuelan Andes. Cities which have this climate zone are Barquisimeto, Maracay, Valencia, Guarenas-Guatire, San Juan de Los Morros, Charallave, Valera, Barinitas, San Antonio del Táchira, Quibor and others.

Cool
It can be found in the country's mountainous areas between 650 and 1,350-1,600 m This climate zone is present in cities like Mérida, San Cristóbal, Caracas, Sanare, Villa de Cura, Ejido, Trujillo, Escuque, Rubio, Tovar, Boconó, Duaca, Bejuma, Los Teques, Nirgua, Santa Elena de Uairen, among others.

Mild/Temperate
Mild or Temperate climate can be found in the mountainous areas between 1,350-1,600 to 2,400 m. This climate zone is present in cities like Mérida (higher part), Colonia Tovar, San Antonio de Los Altos, El Jarillo, El Junquito, Galipan, Timotes, La Grita, Tabay, La Mucuy and others; most of the top of the tepuis also present this climate.

Cold
This climate is characterized by temperatures above  and below , with precipitations that ranges from scarcely rainy (300 – 700 mm) to pluvial (more than 3300 mm) conditions. This climate can be found in mountainous areas around 2,400 to 3,200 m specifically in Sierra de Perija, Cordillera de Mérida, higher elevations at Venezuelan Coastal Range and higher tepuis (Monte Roraima, Kukenan, Cerro Marahuaca, Chimantá Massif). This climate zone is present in towns like Mucuchíes, Chachopo and Los Nevados.

Very Cold
This climate can be found in the Venezuelan Andes area, between 3,200 and 4,150 m. This climate zone is present in towns like Apartaderos and Llano del Hato. The condition of this climate is also known as páramo

Frosty
This climate zone is present exclusively at Sierra Nevada de Mérida, Sierra de La Culata and Sierra de Santo Domingo.

Glacial
This climate is characterized by average temperatures below  all year, it's located in the highest peaks of Venezuela in the Cordillera de Mérida such as Pico Bolívar, Pico Humboldt, Pico La Concha, Pico Bonpland, Pico Espejo, Pico Mucuñuque and  Pico Piedras Blancas. Only Pico Bolivar and Pico Humboldt have their glaciers preserved, while the other peaks are exposed to nival zone conditions.

See also 
 Geography of Venezuela

References

External links 

 
Venezuela